Juan Pistolas is a 1966 Mexican adventure film directed by René Cardona Jr. and starring Javier Solís, Eleazar Garcia and Eva Norvind.

Cast 
 Javier Solís 
 Eleazar Garcia 
 Eva Norvind 
 Aurora Alvarado 
 John Kelly 
 Crox Alvarado 
 Carlos Agostí 
 Guillermo Rivas 
 Carlos Ruffino 
 Stillman Segar 
 Antonio Raxel 
 José Eduardo Pérez 
 Fernando Yapur 
 Manuel Dondé

References

External links 
 

1966 films
1966 adventure films
Mexican adventure films
1960s Spanish-language films
Films directed by René Cardona Jr.
1960s Mexican films